The Convention Center District is an area in southern downtown Dallas, Texas (USA).  It lies south of the Government District, north of the Cedars, west of the Farmers Market District, and east of the Reunion District. Visitdallas is contracted by the City to attract conventions, although an audit released in January 2019 cast doubts on its effectiveness.

Attractions 
 Dallas Convention Center
 Pioneer Plaza
 Pioneer Park Cemetery

Transportation

Highways 
  - Interstate 30
  - Interstate 35E

Trains 
 DART:  and 
 Convention Center Station

Air
 Dallas CBD Vertiport

Education 
The district is zoned to schools in the Dallas Independent School District.

Residents of the district are zoned to City Park Elementary School, Billy Earl Dade Middle School, and James Madison High School.

References

External links 
Dallas Convention & Visitors Bureau